Donald is a closed railway station on the Mildura line, in Donald, Victoria, Australia. It is 294 km from Southern Cross station. The station contains a freight yard, however, the former BP and Mobil sidings were abolished in September 1987.

References

External links
 Melway map at street-directory.com.au

Disused railway stations in Victoria (Australia)